Southern Coffey County Junior-Senior High School is a fully accredited public high school located in LeRoy, Kansas, in the LeRoy-Gridley USD 245 school district, serving students in grades 7–12. SCC has an enrollment of approximately 118 students. The principal is Russ Mildward. The school mascot is the Titans and the school colors are blue and yellow. The school operates on a 4-day school week, with students only attending classes Monday through Thursday.

Extracurricular Activities
The Titans compete in the Lyon County League. The KSHSAA classification is Division II - 1A, the lowest class according to KSHSAA. The school also has a variety of organizations for the students to participate in.

Athletics
The Titans compete in the Lyon County League and are classified 1A-Div. II, the lowest classification in Kansas according to KSHSAA. SCC High School offers the following sports:

 Fall Sports
 Cheerleading
 Cross Country
 Football
 Volleyball

 Winter
 Boys' Basketball
 Girls' Basketball
 Cheerleading

 Spring
 Boys' Track and Field
 Girls' Track and Field

See also

 LeRoy-Gridley USD 245
 List of high schools in Kansas
 List of unified school districts in Kansas

References

External links
 Official Website

Public high schools in Kansas
Public middle schools in Kansas
Schools in Coffey County, Kansas